V.I.P. is a film directed and written by Juliusz Machulski.

External links 
 

1990s thriller films
1990s romance films
1990s Polish-language films
Films directed by Juliusz Machulski